Rush River is an unincorporated community in Kelso Township, Sibley County, Minnesota, United States, near Le Sueur.

The community is located along Sibley County Road 8 near Sibley County Road 17 (391st Avenue).  The South Branch of the Rush River flows through the community.

References

Unincorporated communities in Sibley County, Minnesota
Unincorporated communities in Minnesota